Here We Are is the debut album of Heroes, released by Wang Chung drummer Darren Costin, Michael Casswell, Mike Marshall GB, Chuck Sabo, and Colin Baldry, on RCA Records.

It was originally released in 1987 on LP, cassette, and Compact Disc.  Heroes also released one single, "Driftaway", in addition to the band’s debut album.

Track listing
 "Driftaway" - 4:38
 "Here We Are" - 4:27
 "Let Me In" - 3:28
 "Riverside" - 3:03
 "Dance Your Blues Away" - 4:40
 "Living on a Time Bomb" - 3:31
 "My Heart Beats" - 4:03
 "Dreams for Lovers" - 4:08
 "Face to Face" - 3:42
 "That is Love" - 4:35

Personnel
Lead Vocals: Darren Costin
Lead Vocals on “Face to Face”: Darren Costin & Michael Casswell
Additional Vocals: Michael Casswell, Darren Costin, Kevin Dorsey, Lisa Fischer, Paulette McWilliams, Maxayne Moriguchi
Guitars: Michael Casswell
Bass Guitars: Colin Baldry
Bass Keys: Mike Marshall
Drums: Chuck Sabo
Keyboards: Mike Marshall
Piano: Darren Costin
Trumpet: Gary Grant, Jerry Hey
Tenor Sax: Marc Russo (appears courtesy of MCA Records)
Trombone: Bill Reichenbach Jr.
Main Arranger: Darren Costin
Horn Arrangements: Darren Costin and Jerry Hey
Soprano and Alto Saxophone Solos: Phil Kenzie
Producer: Richard James Burgess (for the Burgess World Co.)
Additional Producer: Brian Malouf
Engineer: Frank Roszak
Production/Recording Coordinator: Janice Crotch
Mastering by Steve Marcussen at Precision Lacquer
Mixed by Brian Malouf
Manager: David Massey
Assistant Manager: Christina Rivett at Domino Directions Ltd., London
Art Director: Ria Lewerke
Designer: Pietro Alfieri
Photographer: John Swanell
Thanks to Stephen Daniel, Patti Felker, Ken Kraus, Lionel Martin, Rosemary Reid, Paul Rodwell, Galaxy, Larrabee & Can-Am Studios, Margaret, Ronny, Kathy, and Randy, Simon Low, Peter Robinson, Korda Marshall, Jeff O'Neil, and Rick O'Neil from RCA, and Zildjian Cymbals.
Special Thanks to Paul Atkinson, Nick Feldman, Rob Kahane, Brian Malouf, David Massey, Peter Reichardt, Christina Rivett, Aureen, and all at Warners Publishing.

Singles
"Driftaway" (US 7" single Double A-side) (1987)
 "Something in the Air" (7 inch) – 4:39

"Driftaway" (US 12" single) (1987)
 "Driftaway" (Extended Dance Mix) – 6:39
 "Driftaway" (Dub Mix) – 5:02
 "Dreams for Lovers" (LP) – 4:09

References

1987 debut albums
RCA Records albums
Albums produced by Richard James Burgess
Wang Chung (band)